Philopotamis is a genus of tropical freshwater snails with an operculum, aquatic gastropod mollusks in thesubfamily Paludominae of the family Paludomidae.

Species
 Philopotamis bicinctus (Reeve, 1854)
 Philopotamis clavatus (Reeve, 1854)
 Philopotamis decussatus (Reeve, 1854)
 Philopotamis globulosus (Gray in Griffith & Pidgeon, 1833)
 Philopotamis nigricans (Reeve, 1847)
 Philopotamis regalis (Layard, 1855)
 Philopotamis sulcatus (Reeve, 1847)
 Philopotamis violaceus (Layard, 1855
Taxon inquirendum
 Philopotamis thwaitesii Layard, 1855

References

 Subba Rao M.V. (1989). Handbook: freshwater molluscs of India. Zoological Survey of India, Calcutta. i-xxiii,1-289

External links
 Layard, E. L. (1855). Observations on the genus Paludomus of Swainson, with descriptions of several new species, and the description of a new species of Anculotus. Proceedings of the Zoological Society of London. 22 (1854): 87-94
 Benson, W. H. (1856). Descriptions of three new species of Paludomus from Burmah, and of some forms of Stenothyra (Nematura) from Penang, Mergui, etc. Annals and Magazine of Natural History, Series 2. 17(102): 494-504
 Neiber M. T. & Glaubrecht M. (2019). Nomenclature of genus-group names of Recent Asian Paludomidae (Gastropoda: Cerithioidea), with a revision of Paludomus (Odontochasma) stomatodon (Benson, 1862) from the Western Ghats, India. Malacologia. 62(2): 329-344
 Nevill, G. (1885). Hand List of Mollusca in the Indian Museum, Calcutta. Part II. Gastropoda. Prosobranchia-Neurobranchia (contd.). x + 306 pp. Office of Superintendent of Government Printing, Calcutta.

Paludomidae